Harry Nelson  (1804-????) was a Newcastle upon Tyne concert hall singer and comedian of the late 19th/early 20th century. He is credited with writing "Hi, canny man hoy a ha'penny oot"

Works 
Harry Nelson made a few recordings right at the end of his career, which included "Hi, canny man" and "Our Jemmie"  (or "Oh, hey ye seen wor Jimmie"), both of which songs are still popular in Tyneside folk clubs. Both these songs survived and are available on the CD  Various Artists - Wor Nanny's A Mazer: Early Recordings Of Artists From The North East 1904-1933 (on Phonograph, PHCD2K1) The full list of tracks on this CD are as follows :-

Recordings
  Harry Nelson – sings "Hi, Canny Man" and "Our Jemmie" on the Various Artists CD, Wor Nanny's A Mazer: Early Recordings Of Artists From The North East 1904-1933.

Harry Nelson made his three records (six sides) just before the outbreak of World War I, only months before his death.  Therefore, the birth date of 1804 appears to be too early - he was performing right until the end.

See also 
 Geordie dialect words

References

External links
 Sources for Newcastle Music

English singers
English songwriters
People from Newcastle upon Tyne (district)
Musicians from Tyne and Wear
Geordie songwriters